Nakatu (also Romanized as Nakatū; also known as Lakatu, Nagatū, Nagtū, and Taktu) is a village in Ijrud-e Pain Rural District of Halab District of Ijrud County, Zanjan province, Iran. At the 2006 National Census, its population was 652 in 146 households. The following census in 2011 counted 672 people in 201 households. The latest census in 2016 showed a population of 606 people in 181 households; it was the largest village in its rural district.

References 

Ijrud County

Populated places in Zanjan Province

Populated places in Ijrud County